The PLA Rocket Force University of Engineering, previously known as the PLA Second Artillery Engineering University is a state university administered by the People's Liberation Army Rocket Force. PLA Rocket Force University of Engineering is located in Baqiao District of Xi'an, Shaanxi, China.

The university consists of 3 colleges and 7 departments. At present, the university has 90 research institutions and research centres, including 1 national engineering research centre, 4 national key laboratories.

History
PLA Second Artillery Engineering University was founded in January 1951, it was initially called "PLA Northwest Military Region Artillery Command College", then it was renamed "PLA First Artillery Command College". In 1956, it was renamed again and called "PLA Xi'an Artillery Command College". In 1959, Teach Brigade of the Department of Defense and 15th PLA Air Force College of Aeronautics merged into the university.
The university changed to its currently in January, following the name change of Second Artillery Corps to Rocket Force.

Schools and Departments
 College of Science 
 College of Basic Education for Commanding Officers
 College of Professional Technology for Officers
 Department of Measurement and Control Engineering
 Department of Electrical Engineering and Automation
 Department of Electronic Engineering
 Department of Weapons and Launch Systems Engineering
 Department of Flight Vehicle Propulsion Engineering
 Department of Nuclear Technology and Security
 Department of Management Engineering
 Department of Environmental Engineering
 Department of Fire Control and Command and Control Engineering
 Department of Mechanical Engineering and Automation
 Department of Communication Engineering
 Department of Information Security
 Department of Information Engineering
 Department of Command Information System Engineering

Notable alumni
 Liu Zheng

References

Universities and colleges in Xi'an
Educational institutions established in 1951
Military education and training in China
1951 establishments in China